Seaver is a surname, and may refer to:

Benjamin Seaver (1795–1856), American politician from Massachusetts; mayor of Boston 1852–53
Blanche Seaver (1891–1994), American philanthropist and musician
Ebenezer Seaver (1763–1844), American politician from Massachusetts; U.S. representative 1803–1
Edwin Seaver (1900–1987), American publisher, writer, editor, critic
Frank Seaver (1883–1964), American lawyer, Navy officer, oil executive, philanthropist
Fred Jay Seaver (1877–1970), American mycologist
Hideo Seaver (contemporary), American voice actor
Jay Webber Seaver (1855–1915), American physician and pioneer of anthropometry
Kristjan Seaver (1898–1941), Estonian Communist politician
Michael Seaver (born 1967), Irish musician and dance critic
Robert Chauncey Seaver (fl. 1907), American amateur tennis player
Thomas O. Seaver (1833–1912), American army officer during the American Civil War; recipient of the Medal of Honor
Tom Seaver (1944–2020), American baseball pitcher

See also
Siever, surname